Frank Madden may refer to:
 Frank Madden (baseball)
 Frank Madden (politician)